Arai (written: 新井 or 荒井) is a Japanese surname. 

"新井" means "new residence.”

Notable people with the surname include:

, Japanese singer and lyricist
Alberto Arai (1915–1955), Mexican architect and writer
, Japanese water polo player
, Japanese politician, younger brother of Iemitsu Arai
, Japanese scholar and politician
, Japanese screenwriter
, Japanese manga artist
, Japanese actor
, Japanese footballer
, Japanese politician
, Japanese politician, older brother of Etsuji Arai
, Japanese samurai
 (born 1964), birthname of Japanese singer and actress 
, Japanese male professional wrestler
, Japanese football player
, Japanese male golfer
, Japanese manga artist
, Japanese retired football player
, Japanese women's tennis player
, Japanese female pair skater
, Japanese male wrestler
, Japanese astronomer
, Japanese diver
, Japanese science fiction writer
, Japanese footballer
, Japanese baseball player
, Japanese male freestyle swimmer
, Japanese female wheelchair racer
, Japanese mathematical logician and artificial intelligence researcher
Ryohei Arai (disambiguation), multiple people
, Japanese businessman
, Japanese illustrator
, Japanese baseball player
, Japanese Biblical scholar
, Japanese voice actress
, Japanese politician
, Japanese male freestyle swimmer
, Japanese politician
Shota Arai (disambiguation), multiple people
, Japanese professional wrestler promoter
, Japanese baseball player
, Japanese beauty pageant contestant
, Japanese football player
, Japanese engineer
, Japanese football player
, Japanese rally driver and team owner
, Japanese female fencer
 (born 1954), birthname of Japanese musician 
Zack Arai, Japanese adult video director

Japanese-language surnames